Olkhovka is a rural locality (a village) in Chernushinsky District, Perm Krai, Russia. The population was 2 as of 2010.

Geography 
Olkhovka is located 28 km northeast of Chernushka (the district's administrative centre) by road. Kazantsevo is the nearest rural locality.

References 

Rural localities in Chernushinsky District